Anthony William Mundine OAM (born 9 June 1951) is an Australian former boxer, and one of the country's most accomplished indigenous fighters. The only Australian boxer to compete professionally in four weight divisions, he held the Australian middleweight, light heavyweight, cruiserweight and heavyweight titles, as well as the Commonwealth middleweight and light heavyweight titles. He also challenged once for the WBA world middleweight title in 1974. He is the father of former world champion boxer Anthony Mundine, and cousin of Warren Mundine.

Mundine was the 2005 Inductee for the Australian National Boxing Hall of Fame Moderns category.

Rugby League 
Mundine played centre three-quarter for a Grafton Rugby league team. He showed promise and was offered a place with the Redfern All Blacks in the South Sydney Junior Rugby League in 1968 at age 17. Rather than return to Baryulgil to work at the asbestos mine between seasons he kept fit at Ern McQuillan's gym in Newtown, where he showed natural ability and speed. McQuillan engaged him in a fighter-trainer contract.

Boxing 
Mundine won his first match on 5 March 1969 against Frank Graham. In his fifth professional bout, Ray Wheatley dropped Mundine in their scheduled ten round contest in round one to become the only Australian to have Mundine on the canvas at the Manly Leagues club in May 1969. Mundine stopped Wheatley in round two. In less than a year he won his first title, the Australian Middleweight crown. His last bout was against Alex Sua on 19 March 1984.

His titles were:

 Australian Middleweight title, 23 April 1970 against Billy Choules
 Australian Heavyweight title, 25 February 1972 against Foster Bibron
 Commonwealth Middleweight title, 14 April 1972 against Bunny Sterling
 Australian and Commonwealth Light Heavyweight titles, 30 October 1975 against Steve Aczel
 Australian Cruiserweight title, 24 July 1981 against Steve Aczel.

Mundine challenged Carlos Monzón on 5 October 1974 for the WBA World Middleweight title but lost by a knockout in the 7th round. He was undefeated by any Australian boxer during his 16-year career. He fought many top boxers including Emile Griffith, Monty Betham, Steve Aczel, Bennie Briscoe and Alex Sua.

Professional boxing record 

|-
| style="text-align:center;" colspan="8"|80 Wins (64 knockouts, 16 decisions), 15 Losses (10 knockouts, 5 decisions), 1 Draw 
|-  style="text-align:center; background:#e3e3e3;"
|  style="border-style:none none solid solid; "|Result
|  style="border-style:none none solid solid; "|Record
|  style="border-style:none none solid solid; "|Opponent
|  style="border-style:none none solid solid; "|Type
|  style="border-style:none none solid solid; "|Round
|  style="border-style:none none solid solid; "|Date
|  style="border-style:none none solid solid; "|Location
|  style="border-style:none none solid solid; "|Notes
|-
|Loss
|
|align=left|Alex Sua
|PTS
|12
|19 March 1984
|align=left|Auckland, New Zealand
|align=left|
|-
|Loss
|
|align=left|Rufino Angulo
|KO
|5
|13 June 1983
|align=left|Paris, France
|align=left|
|-
|Win
|
|align=left|Dragomir Milo Popovic
|TKO
|6
|6 November 1982
|align=left|Noumea, New Caledonia
|align=left|
|-
|Loss
|
|align=left|Murray Sutherland
|UD
|10
|6 September 1982
|align=left|Brisbane, Queensland, Australia
|align=left|
|-
|Win
|
|align=left|Mustafa Wasajja
|PTS
|10
|11 June 1982
|align=left|Marseille, Bouches-du-Rhône, France
|align=left|
|-
|Win
|
|align=left|Hocine Tafer
|KO
|2
|8 May 1982
|align=left|Grenoble, Isère, France
|align=left|
|-
|Loss
|
|align=left|Yaqui Lopez
|TKO
|3
|27 November 1981
|align=left|Gold Coast, Queensland, Australia
|align=left|
|-
|Win
|
|align=left|Steve Aczel
|TKO
|6
|24 July 1981
|align=left|Brisbane, Queensland, Australia
|align=left|
|-
|Win
|
|align=left|Bunny Johnson
|TKO
|10
|20 May 1981
|align=left|Gold Coast, Queensland, Australia
|align=left|
|-
|Loss
|
|align=left|Jesse Burnett
|PTS
|12
|4 March 1981
|align=left|Auckland, New Zealand
|align=left|
|-
|Win
|
|align=left|Monty Betham
|KO
|5
|15 December 1980
|align=left|Auckland, New Zealand
|align=left|
|-
|Win
|
|align=left|Joe Fabiano
|KO
|6
|20 September 1980
|align=left|Noumea, New Caledonia
|align=left|
|-
|Win
|
|align=left|Steve Aczel
|TKO
|9
|28 July 1980
|align=left|Brisbane, Queensland, Australia
|align=left|
|-
|Win
|
|align=left|David "The King" Smith
|UD
|10
|30 May 1980
|align=left|Pirae, French Polynesia
|align=left|
|-
|Win
|
|align=left|David Conteh
|PTS
|10
|18 April 1980
|align=left|Bologna, Emilia Romagna, Italy
|align=left|
|-
|Win
|
|align=left|Pat Cuillo
|DQ
|5
|4 April 1980
|align=left|Milan, Lombardia, Italy
|align=left|
|-
|Win
|
|align=left|Johnny Wilburn
|PTS
|8
|14 December 1979
|align=left|Milan, Lombardia, Italy
|align=left|
|-
|Win
|
|align=left|Ennio Cometti
|TKO
|9
|30 November 1979
|align=left|Trieste, Friuli-Venezia Giulia, Italy
|align=left|
|-
|Loss
|
|align=left|Mate Parlov
|PTS
|12
|26 September 1979
|align=left|Gorizia, Friuli-Venezia Giulia, Italy
|align=left|
|-
|Win
|
|align=left|Pete McIntyre
|TKO
|5
|3 August 1979
|align=left|Sydney, Australia
|align=left|
|-
|Win
|
|align=left|Tony "Lime" Greene
|KO
|4
|20 April 1979
|align=left|Melbourne, Australia
|align=left|
|-
|Win
|
|align=left|Marc Ecimovic
|TKO
|2
|31 March 1979
|align=left|Melbourne, Australia
|align=left|
|-
|Win
|
|align=left|Ananai Curebera
|TKO
|2
|18 February 1979
|align=left|Sydney, Australia
|align=left|
|-
|Win
|
|align=left|Ron "Mr." Wilson
|TKO
|7
|9 February 1979
|align=left|Brisbane, Queensland, Australia
|align=left|
|-
|Win
|
|align=left|Karl Canwell
|TKO
|3
|24 November 1978
|align=left|Brisbane, Queensland, Australia
|align=left|
|-
|Win
|
|align=left|Fossie Schmidt
|KO
|1
|15 July 1978
|align=left|Suva, Fiji
|align=left|
|-
|Loss
|
|align=left|Gary Summerhays
|KO
|11
|27 February 1978
|align=left|Melbourne, Australia
|align=left|
|-
|Win
|
|align=left|Andros Ernie Barr
|PTS
|10
|24 January 1978
|align=left|Melbourne, Australia
|align=left|
|-
|Win
|
|align=left|Maile Haumona
|KO
|3
|5 December 1977
|align=left|Melbourne, Australia
|align=left|
|-
|Win
|
|align=left|Danny Brewer
|KO
|7
|21 October 1977
|align=left|Brisbane, Queensland, Australia
|align=left|
|-
|Win
|
|align=left|Dave Lee Royster
|PTS
|10
|9 September 1977
|align=left|Brisbane, Queensland, Australia
|align=left|
|-
|Loss
|
|align=left|Dave Lee Royster
|KO
|1
|28 July 1977
|align=left|Port Moresby, Papua New Guinea
|align=left|
|-
|Win
|
|align=left|Andros Ernie Barr
|PTS
|15
|8 July 1977
|align=left|Brisbane, Queensland, Australia
|align=left|
|-
|Win
|
|align=left|Maile Haumona
|TKO
|10
|2 June 1977
|align=left|Port Moresby, Papua New Guinea
|align=left|
|-
|Win
|
|align=left|Victor Attivor
|TKO
|9
|4 September 1976
|align=left|Accra, Ghana
|align=left|
|-
|Win
|
|align=left|Maile Haumona
|PTS
|10
|11 August 1976
|align=left|Sydney, Australia
|align=left|
|-
|Loss
|
|align=left|Jesse Burnett
|KO
|6
|14 May 1976
|align=left|Brisbane, Queensland, Australia
|align=left|
|-
|Win
|
|align=left|Baby Boy Rolle
|KO
|3
|26 March 1976
|align=left|Brisbane, Queensland, Australia
|align=left|
|-
|Win
|
|align=left|Karl Zurheide
|KO
|1
|19 March 1976
|align=left|Sydney, Australia
|align=left|
|-
|Win
|
|align=left|Victor Attivor
|TKO
|2
|4 December 1975
|align=left|Sydney, Australia
|align=left|
|-
|Win
|
|align=left|Steve Aczel
|KO
|12
|30 October 1975
|align=left|Sydney, Australia
|align=left|
|-
|Win
|
|align=left|"Shoeless" Joe Jackson
|PTS
|10
|4 September 1975
|align=left|Sydney, Australia
|align=left|
|-
|Loss
|
|align=left|"Sweet" James Marshall
|KO
|1
|2 May 1975
|align=left|Brisbane, Queensland, Australia
|align=left|
|-
|Loss
|
|align=left|Rudy Robles
|PTS
|10
|28 February 1975
|align=left|Brisbane, Queensland, Australia
|align=left|
|-
|Loss
|
|align=left|Carlos Monzon
|KO
|7
|5 October 1974
|align=left|Buenos Aires, Argentina
|align=left|
|-
|Win
|
|align=left|Nate "Nat" Collins
|TKO
|5
|9 August 1974
|align=left|Brisbane, Queensland, Australia
|align=left|
|-
|Win
|
|align=left|Lenny Harden
|KO
|3
|27 May 1974
|align=left|Paris, France
|align=left|
|-
|Win
|
|align=left|Don Cobbs
|TKO
|6
|10 May 1974
|align=left|Brisbane, Queensland, Australia
|align=left|
|-
|Loss
|
|align=left|Bennie Briscoe
|KO
|5
|25 February 1974
|align=left|Paris, France
|align=left|
|-
|Win
|
|align=left|Manuel Fierro
|KO
|6
|11 February 1974
|align=left|Brisbane, Queensland, Australia
|align=left|
|-
|Win
|
|align=left|Emile Griffith
|UD
|12
|19 November 1973
|align=left|Paris, France
|align=left|
|-
|Win
|
|align=left|Carlos Marks
|PTS
|15
|28 September 1973
|align=left|Brisbane, Queensland, Australia
|align=left|
|-
|Win
|
|align=left|Fred Etuati
|KO
|1
|20 August 1973
|align=left|Auckland, New Zealand
|align=left|
|-
|Win
|
|align=left|Carlos Marks
|KO
|10
|3 August 1973
|align=left|Brisbane, Queensland, Australia
|align=left|
|-
|Win
|
|align=left|Nessim Max Cohen
|TKO
|4
|14 May 1973
|align=left|Paris, France
|align=left|
|-
|Win
|
|align=left|Luis Vinales
|TKO
|2
|1 May 1973
|align=left|Brisbane, Queensland, Australia
|align=left|
|-
|Win
|
|align=left|Matt "Art" Donovan
|KO
|3
|7 February 1973
|align=left|Sydney, Australia
|align=left|
|-
|Win
|
|align=left|Lonnie Harris
|TKO
|5
|8 December 1972
|align=left|Brisbane, Queensland, Australia
|align=left|
|-
|Win
|
|align=left|Roy "General" Lee
|KO
|2
|4 November 1972
|align=left|Noumea, New Caledonia
|align=left|
|-
|Win
|
|align=left|"San" Antonio Aguilar
|TKO
|3
|26 September 1972
|align=left|Sydney, Australia
|align=left|
|-
|Win
|
|align=left|Juarez de Lima
|TKO
|5
|21 August 1972
|align=left|Brisbane, Queensland, Australia
|align=left|
|-
|Win
|
|align=left|Denny Moyer
|TKO
|7
|31 May 1972
|align=left|Sydney, Australia
|align=left|
|-
|Win
|
|align=left|Bunny Sterling
|KO
|15
|14 April 1972
|align=left|Brisbane, Queensland, Australia
|align=left|
|-
|Win
|
|align=left|Foster Bibron
|TKO
|11
|25 February 1972
|align=left|Brisbane, Queensland, Australia
|align=left|
|-
|Win
|
|align=left|George "Hurricane" Carter
|TKO
|2
|17 February 1972
|align=left|Sydney, Australia
|align=left|
|-
|Win
|
|align=left|Charley "Bad News" Austin
|TKO
|2
|10 December 1971
|align=left|Brisbane, Queensland, Australia
|align=left|
|-
|Win
|
|align=left|Eric Blake
|TKO
|3
|26 November 1971
|align=left|Brisbane, Queensland, Australia
|align=left|
|-
|Win
|
|align=left|Tommy "Gun" Gray
|TKO
|7
|22 October 1971
|align=left|Brisbane, Queensland, Australia
|align=left|
|-
|Win
|
|align=left|Rod Kenny
|TKO
|4
|23 September 1971
|align=left|Sydney, Australia
|align=left|
|-
|Win
|
|align=left|Jackson McQuade
|KO
|1
|5 September 1971
|align=left|Brisbane, Queensland, Australia
|align=left|
|-
|Win
|
|align=left|Al Korovou
|KO
|5
|1 July 1971
|align=left|Sydney, Australia
|align=left|
|-
|Loss
|
|align=left|Luis Manuel Rodriguez
|KO
|1
|7 April 1971
|align=left|Melbourne, Australia
|align=left|
|-
|Win
|
|align=left|Victor Manuel Basilio
|TKO
|2
|18 February 1971
|align=left|Sydney, Australia
|align=left|
|-
|Draw
|
|align=left|Bunny Sterling
|PTS
|15
|21 January 1971
|align=left|Sydney, Australia
|align=left|
|-
|Win
|
|align=left|Barry Calderwood
|TKO
|5
|12 December 1970
|align=left|Melbourne, Australia
|align=left|
|-
|Win
|
|align=left|Johnny Kramer
|TKO
|5
|25 August 1970
|align=left|Sydney, Australia
|align=left|
|-
|Win
|
|align=left|Billy "Mellow" Marsh
|TKO
|8
|16 July 1970
|align=left|Sydney, Australia
|align=left|
|-
|Win
|
|align=left|Filipino Ravalo
|KO
|2
|9 June 1970
|align=left|Sydney, Australia
|align=left|
|-
|Win
|
|align=left|Ravuama Roko
|KO
|2
|28 May 1970
|align=left|Sydney, Australia
|align=left|
|-
|Win
|
|align=left|Billy Choules
|KO
|4
|23 April 1970
|align=left|Sydney, Australia
|align=left|
|-
|Win
|
|align=left|Jeke Naqelevuki
|TKO
|3
|19 March 1970
|align=left|Sydney, Australia
|align=left|
|-
|Win
|
|align=left|Sione Sani
|KO
|1
|10 March 1970
|align=left|Sydney, Australia
|align=left|
|-
|Win
|
|align=left|Billy Choules
|KO
|4
|9 February 1970
|align=left|Melbourne, Australia
|align=left|
|-
|Win
|
|align=left|Billy Opetaia
|TKO
|7
|17 December 1969
|align=left|Sydney, Australia
|align=left|
|-
|Win
|
|align=left|Feleti Leone
|TKO
|2
|12 December 1969
|align=left|Melbourne, Australia
|align=left|
|-
|Loss
|
|align=left|Kahu Mahanga
|KO
|9
|10 November 1969
|align=left|Melbourne, Australia
|align=left|
|-
|Win
|
|align=left|Les "Jazzer" Dixon
|KO
|2
|22 October 1969
|align=left|Sydney, Australia
|align=left|
|-
|Win
|
|align=left|Lee Moto
|KO
|5
|23 September 1969
|align=left|Sydney, Australia
|align=left|
|-
|Win
|
|align=left|Sione Sani
|PTS
|8
|8 September 1969
|align=left|Melbourne, Australia
|align=left|
|-
|Win
|
|align=left|Ted McKenzie
|KO
|3
|28 July 1969
|align=left|Sydney, Australia
|align=left|
|-
|Win
|
|align=left|Ricky Datsun
|PTS
|8
|23 June 1969
|align=left|Melbourne, Australia
|align=left|
|-
|Win
|
|align=left|"Sugar" Ray Wheatley
|KO
|2
|28 May 1969
|align=left|Sydney, Australia
|align=left|
|-
|Win
|
|align=left|Ted McKenzie
|KO
|5
|7 May 1969
|align=left|Sydney, Australia
|align=left|
|-
|Win
|
|align=left|Ted McKenzie
|PTS
|10
|16 April 1969
|align=left|Sydney, Australia
|align=left|
|-
|Win
|
|align=left|Frank "Evangelist" Graham
|KO
|3
|9 April 1969
|align=left|Sydney, Australia
|align=left|
|-
|Win
|
|align=left|Frank "Evangelist" Graham
|PTS
|4
|5 March 1969
|align=left|Sydney, Australia
|align=left|
|}

Mundine currently lives in Redfern, New South Wales, where he manages a training gym called Redfern Gym adjacent to the Block.

Mundine is father and boxing trainer/promoter of former World Super Middleweight Champion Anthony Mundine. Mundine's older brother Mickey Mundine played in the first Australian Aboriginal rugby league team in 1973.

On 26 January 1986 Mundine was awarded the Medal of the Order of Australia for "service to sport particularly to boxing and to aboriginal youth". He was the winner of The Ella Award for Lifetime Achievement in Aboriginal and Torres Strait Islander Sport at the Deadly Awards in 2004.

References

External links 
 
 Vibe Australia
 The Fighting Mundines From Sydney, Australia
 Welcome to the jungle gym

|-

|-

|-

|-

|-

|-

|-

1951 births
Living people
People from the Northern Rivers
Indigenous Australian boxers
Cruiserweight boxers
Light-heavyweight boxers
Middleweight boxers
Heavyweight boxers
Recipients of the Medal of the Order of Australia
Bundjalung people
Australian male boxers
Commonwealth Boxing Council champions
Sportsmen from New South Wales